The 1879 Minnesota gubernatorial election was held on November 4, 1879 to elect the governor of Minnesota. Incumbent John S. Pillsbury was reelected to a third term.

Ara Barton was the initial Greenback nominee, but he declined the nomination and was replaced by William Meigher.

Results

References

1879
Minnesota
gubernatorial
November 1879 events